Mikhail Vasilyevich Lyapunov was a Russian astronomer and a head of the Demidov Lyceum in Yaroslavl. 

He was the father of Aleksandr and Sergei Lyapunov.

References

1820 births
1868 deaths
Astronomers from the Russian Empire
Mikhail